List of monuments of Shusha, a city in the disputed region of Nagorno-Karabakh in the South Caucasus.

 Kurgan – Bronze Age (north-west of Shusha)
 Shusha and Sushakend stone graves - Last Bronze and First Iron Age (near Shusha)
 Shusha cave camp - Stone Age (south of Shusha city, on the left bank of the Dashalty River)
 Shusha stone box necropolis - Iron Age (Garabulag village)
 Necropolis - The Last Bronze and First Iron Age (Dolanlar village)
 Shusha fortress - 1754 (Shusha city)
 Panah Khan castle - 18th century (Shusha city)
 Gara Boyuk khanum tower – 18th century (Shusha city)
 Haji Heydar tomb - (Shusha city)
 Hajigullar's palace - 18th century (Shusha city)
 Natavan's house - 18th century (Shusha city)
 House of Asad bey - 18th century (Shusha city)
 Yukhari Govhar Agha Mosque - 1768–1769
 Ashaghi Govhar Agha Mosque - 18th century (Shusha city)
 Two-storey caravanserai - 19th century (Shusha city)
 Karim bey Mehmandarov mansion complex: mosque, residence, - 18th century (Shusha city)
 Isa spring - 19th century (near the city of Shusha)
 Ibrahim Khan castle - 18th century (Dashalty village)
 Taza Mahalla Mosque - 19th century (Shusha city)
 House-Museum of Uzeyir Hajibeyov - 19th century (Shusha city)
 Azerbaijan State Museum of History of Karabakh - 20th century (Shusha city)
 Khanluk Mukhtar  Caravanserai - 18th century (Shusha city)
 Caravanserai of Agha Gahraman Mirsiyab, Mirsiyab's son - 18th century (Shusha city)
 House of Zulfugar Hajibeyov - 19th century (Shusha city)
 Saatli Mosque - 18th century (Shusha city)
 Ganja Gate - 18th century (Shusha city)
 Abdurrahim bey Hagverdiyev's house - 18th century (Shusha city)
 Qazançı church - 19th century (Shusha city)
 Yusif Vazir Chamanzaminli's house - 18th century (Shusha city)
 Upper Mosque madrasah - 18th century (Shusha city)
 Safarov brothers' caravanserai - 18th century (Shusha city)
 house of tar player Sadigjan - 18th century (Shusha city)
 House of Ughurlu bey - 18th century (Shusha city)
 Palace of Karabakh Khans - 18th-19th centuries (Shusha city)
 Shirin Su hammam - 18th century (Shusha city)
 House of Khananda Seyid Shushinski – 19th century (Shusha city)
 Tomb of poet Molla Panah Vagif - 20th century (Shusha City)
 House of Gasim bey Zakir - 18th century (Shusha city)
 Madrasah - 18th century (Shusha city)
 House of Behbudovs - 18th century (Shusha city)
 House of Firidun bey Kocharli - 18th century (Shusha city)
 House of Mir Mohsun Navvab – 18th century (Shusha city)
 House of Bulbul - 19th century (Shusha city)
 House of Firidun bey Kocharli - 19th century (Shusha city)
 House of Hussein bey - 18th century (Shusha city)
 House of Mohammed - 19th century (Shusha city)
 Caravanserai - 18th century (Shusha city)
 House of Garay Asadov - 18th century (Shusha city)
 House of Suleyman Sani Akhundov – 19th century (Shusha city)
 House of Jabbar Garyaghdioglu – 18th century (Shusha city)
 Shusha Realni School - 20th century (Shusha city)
 Hospital building - 19th century (Shusha city)
 Residential building - 19th century (Shusha city)
 Girls’ school – 19th century (Shusha city)
 House of Aslan Garasharov - 19th century (Shusha city)
 House of Mashadi Ibrahim - 29th century (Shusha city)
 Residence - 18th century (Shusha city)
 House of Mashadi Nowruz – 19th century (Shusha city)
 House of Hasan Agha – 19th century (Shusha city)
 Residence – 19th century (Shusha city)
 Residence – 18th century (Shusha city)
 House of Shukur bey – 19th century (Shusha city)
 House of Jafargulu agha Javanshir Agha – 18th century (Shusha city)
 church ruins (Shusha city)
 Tomb – (Shusha city)
 Spring – 18th century (Shusha city)
 “Lachin” water reservoir - 19th century (Shusha city)
 Maiden monastery - 18th century (Shusha city)
 House of  – 19th century (Shusha city)
 Hammam – 19th century (Malibeyli village)
 Mosque - 19th century (Malibeyli village)
 Novlu spring – 19th century (Malibeyli village)
 Administrative building - 19th century (Malibeyli village)
 House of Mamay bey - 18th century (Shusha city)
 House of Mashadi Teymur - 18th century (Shusha city)
 Shor spring - 19th century (Shusha city)
 House of Khalil Mammadov - 19th century (Shusha city)
 House of  - 19th century (Shusha city)
 Chukhur Mahalla Mosque - 19th century (Shusha city)
 House of  - 18th century (Shusha city)
 Haji Abbas Mosque and Caravanserai - 19th century (Shusha city)
 Mardinli Mosque - 19th century (Shusha city)
 House of  - 18th century (Shusha city)
 House of Haji Mammad - 18th century (Shusha city)
 Haji Yusifli Mosque - 18th century (Shusha city)
 House of Mashadi Salman - 18th century (Shusha city)
 Julfas mosque - 19th century (Shusha city)
 Mill - beginning of the 20th century (Shusha city)
 House of Haji Alibala - 18th century (Shusha city)
 Home of Kabla Azad - 19th century (Shusha city)
 House of Haji Sadir - 19th century (Shusha city)
 "Chol Gala" spring - 18th century (Shusha city)
 The house of Mashadi Sulayman - 18th century (Shusha city)
 House of Mousavi - 18th century (Shusha city)
 House of Haji Mammadbagir - 19th century (Shusha city)
 House of Husu Hajiyev - 19th century (Shusha city)
 House of Mashadi Zeynal Hatamov - 18th century (Shusha city)
 House of Mashadi Ali - 18th century (Shusha city)
 House of Mashadi Shahriyar - 18th century (Shusha city)
 House of Haji Dadash - 18th century (Shusha city)
 House of A. Azimov - 18th century (Shusha city)
 House of Mashadi Ibrahim - 18th century (Shusha city)
 House of Mashadi Jalal - 18th century (Shusha city)
 Meidan spring - 18th century (Shusha city)
 House of Haji Bashir - 18th century (Shusha city)
 House of Darzi Bahram - 18th century (Shusha city)
 House of Mashadi Husu - 18th century (Shusha city)
 House of Mohammed Hasan oghlu - 18th century (Shusha city)
 House of Kabla Mohammad - 19th century (Shusha city)
 Khoja Marjanli Mosque - 18th century (Shusha city)
 Khoja Mercanli spring - 18th century (Shusha city)
 Treasury of Bahman Mirza - 19th century (Shusha city)
 Food storage of Bahman Mirza - 19th century (Shusha city)
 House of Gulamshah - 19th century (Shusha city)
 House of Najaf bey Vazirov - 19th century (Shusha city)
 Kocharli mosque - 19th century (Shusha city)
 Guyulug Mosque - XVIII century (Shusha city)
 House of Seyid Mejid - 18th century (Shusha city)
 Spring (Seyidli Mahalla) - 18th century (Shusha city)
 Seyidli Mosque – 18th century (Shusha city)
 House of Mashadi Gara - 18th century (Shusha city)
 House of Kabla Yusif - 19th century (Shusha city)
 House of Zohrabeyov 19th century (Shusha city)
 House of Mashadi Ibish- 18th century (Shusha city)
 House of Mashadi Zulfugar - 19th century (Shusha city)
 House of Haji Aslan - 18th century (Shusha city)
 House of Haji Malik's son - 18th century (Shusha city)
 House Mir Hasan Vezirov - 19th century (Shusha city)
 Mamayi Mosque – 19th century (Shusha city)
 Mamayi spring – 19th century (Shusha city)
 House of Faramazovs - 18th century (Shusha city)
 Spring (Haji Yusifli Mahalla) – 18th century (Shusha city)
 Spring (Aghadadali Mahalla) – 19th century (Shusha city)
 Spring (Kocharli Mahalla) – 18th century (Shusha city)
 Spring (Chukhur Mahalla) – 18th century (Shusha city)
 Pottery spring – 18th century (Zarisli village)

References

Shusha
Palaces in Azerbaijan

az:Qaraböyük xanım sarayı